Harbor High School was a public high school that served the harbor area of Ashtabula, Ohio from 1911 until it was closed in 2001 in order to merge with nearby Ashtabula High School under the name of Lakeside High School.  The building then housed 9th grade until the new Lakeside was completed in 2006.  The "McKinley Building" (as it was known) of Harbor High was torn down in 2009.

Wenner Field, the location of Harbor's football games, was at 1700 W. 10th Street.

Notable alumni

Don Scott- WJZ-TV morning news anchorman (1974-2014)

References

High schools in Ashtabula County, Ohio
Ashtabula, Ohio
Defunct schools in Ohio